Edward Stewart may refer to:

 Edward Stewart (bishop), bishop of Orkney between c. 1503 and c. 1525
 Edward Richard Stewart (1782–1851), Scottish Whig then Liberal politician
 Edward Stewart (politician) (1808–1875), Scottish Whig then Liberal politician
 E. W. Stewart (fl. 1900), Irish trade unionist and politician
 Edward Stewart (rugby union) (1901–1979), New Zealand rugby union player
 Edward Stewart (set decorator) (1915–1999), American set decorator
 Ed Stewart (1941–2016), English broadcaster